Seyni is a name. Notable people with the name include:

Given name
Seyni Garba, Nigerien army general
Seyni Kountché (1931–1987), Nigerien military officer and president
Seyni N'Diaye (born 1973), Senegalese football player
Seyni Oumarou (born 1951), Nigerien politician

Surname
 Aminatou Seyni (born 1996), Nigerien sprinter